LAB is an alternative rock band from Helsinki, Finland. Their single "Beat the Boys" was featured in the PS2/Xbox/PC game "Flatout".

The band has released three albums.

Formation
The band formed in 1997, and consisted of five members. (Singer Ana and guitarist Johannes are siblings).
 Ana Leppälä - lead singer
 Pekka "Splendid" Laine - guitar
 Johannes Leppälä - guitar
 Kirka Sainio - bass (Airdash, The Scourger, Gandalf)
 Masa - drummer

Discography

Albums
 Porn Beautiful (2000)
 Devil Is a Girl (2002)
 Where Heaven Ends (2005)

Singles
 Get Me a Name (06/1999)
 'Til You're Numb (09/1999)
 Isn't He Beautiful (02/2000)
 Killing Me (06/2000)
 Beat the Boys (02/2002)
 Machine Girl (07/2003)
 When Heaven Gets Dirty (03/2005)
 Love Like Hell (04/2005)

Music videos
 'Til You're Numb
 Beat the Boys
 Machine Girl
 When Heaven Gets Dirty
The majority of their music videos feature the singer Ana wearing a pair of white angel wings.

References

External links
 LAB Official site
 LABmusicofficial on Facebook

Finnish alternative rock groups